Sukie is an English four piece indie band. 

Sukie may also refer to:
 
 Sukie Rougemont, fictional character in The Witches of Eastwick and in the film based on it
 Sukie Smith (born 1964), English actress and musician
 Principessa Sukie Tempesta, fictional character in Nobody Lives for Ever by John Gardner

See also
 Suki (disambiguation)
 Sookie
 Susan